Orion the Hunter may refer to:
Orion (mythology)
Orion (astronomy), a constellation representing the mythological Orion
Orion the Hunter (band)
Orion the Hunter (album), the eponymous debut album by Orion the Hunter

See also
 Orion (disambiguation)
 Hunter (disambiguation)